Krupajal Engineering College, Bhubaneswar, also called KEC is an engineering institution in the Eastern Zone of Odisha, which was established in 1995 under the Krupajal Group of institutions. The college certifies to ISO 9001:2000 and is rated as an A grade engineering college by NACC.

The college is approved by AICTE, New Delhi, affiliated to Biju Patnaik University of Technology, Odisha and accredited by NBA & NAAC, New Delhi situated at Kausalya Ganga, Puba Sasan, Bhubaneswar. It has 30 acres of area with a built up area of 1.5 lac square feet.

Admission procedure
The students are admitted through the OJEE/AIEEE National level entrance test. There is provision of Lateral Entry of 10% of sanctioned intake for Diploma holders directly to the 3rd semester as per the BPUT guidelines. The students for postgraduation courses in M.Tech are admitted through GATE Score.

References

External links
 
 
 KEC Online Info. System
 KEC on Google Map

Private engineering colleges in India
All India Council for Technical Education
Engineering colleges in Odisha
Science and technology in Bhubaneswar
Universities and colleges in Bhubaneswar
Colleges affiliated with Biju Patnaik University of Technology
Educational institutions established in 1995
1995 establishments in Orissa